The U.S. state of Colorado currently has 26 Colorado Scenic and Historic Byways with  of roadway. Of these 26 byways, 21 currently have at least one federal designation. These 26 byways include:
2 All-American Roads designated by the Federal Highway Administration;
11 National Scenic Byways designated by the Federal Highway Administration;
10 National Forest Scenic Byways designated by the United States Forest Service;
3 Back Country Byways designated by the Bureau of Land Management; and
All 26 Colorado Scenic and Historic Byways designated by the Colorado Scenic and Historic Byways Commission.
For full information about all these scenic byways, see the List of Colorado Scenic and Historic Byways.


List of All-American Roads in Colorado

San Juan Skyway Scenic and Historic Byway
Trail Ridge Road/Beaver Meadow Scenic Byway

List of National Scenic Byways in Colorado

Two adjacent National Scenic Byways in New Mexico have  of roadway. Two adjacent National Scenic Byways in Utah have  of roadway. Two adjacent National Scenic Byways in Arizona have  of roadway.
Colorado River Headwaters Scenic Byway
Dinosaur Diamond Scenic Byway
Frontier Pathways Scenic Byway
Gold Belt Tour Scenic and Historic Byway
Highway of Legends Scenic Byway
Lariat Loop Scenic and Historic Byway
Santa Fe Trail Scenic and Historic Byway
Silver Thread Scenic and Historic Byway
Top of the Rockies Scenic Byway
Trail of the Ancients Scenic and Historic Byway

List of National Forest Scenic Byways in Colorado

San Juan Skyway Scenic and Historic Byway
Grand Mesa Scenic Byway
Highway of Legends Scenic Byway
Silver Thread Scenic and Historic Byway
Cache la Poudre-North Park Scenic Byway
Flat Tops Trail Scenic Byway
Guanella Pass Scenic Byway
Mount Evans Scenic Byway
Peak to Peak Scenic Byway
West Elk Loop Scenic and Historic Byway

List of Back Country Byways in Colorado

Gold Belt Tour Scenic and Historic Byway
Alpine Loop Back Country Byway
Los Caminos Antiguos Scenic and Historic Byway

Two federal designations

Five scenic byways in Colorado have two federal designations.

The following scenic byway is an All-American Road, a National Forest Scenic Byway, and a Colorado Scenic and Historic Byway:
San Juan Skyway Scenic and Historic Byway

The following three scenic byways are National Scenic Byways, National Forest Scenic Byways, and Colorado Scenic and Historic Byways:
Grand Mesa Scenic Byway
Highway of Legends Scenic Byway
Silver Thread Scenic and Historic Byway

The following scenic byway is a National Scenic Byway, a Back Country Byway, and a Colorado Scenic and Historic Byway:
Gold Belt Tour Scenic and Historic Byway

List of Colorado Scenic and Historic Byways

Three adjacent scenic byways in New Mexico have  of roadway. Two adjacent scenic byways in Utah have  of roadway. Two adjacent scenic byways in Arizona have  of roadway.
Alpine Loop Back Country Byway
Cache la Poudre-North Park Scenic Byway
Collegiate Peaks Scenic Byway
Colorado River Headwaters Scenic Byway
Dinosaur Diamond Scenic and Historic Byway
Flat Tops Trail Scenic Byway
Frontier Pathways Scenic Byway
Gold Belt Tour Scenic and Historic Byway
Grand Mesa Scenic Byway
Guanella Pass Scenic Byway
Highway of Legends Scenic Byway
Lariat Loop Scenic and Historic Byway
Los Caminos Antiguos Scenic and Historic Byway
Mount Evans Scenic Byway
Pawnee Pioneer Trails Scenic Byway
Peak to Peak Scenic Byway
San Juan Skyway Scenic and Historic Byway
Santa Fe Trail Scenic and Historic Byway
Silver Thread Scenic and Historic Byway
South Platte River Trail Scenic and Historic Byway
Top of the Rockies Scenic Byway
Tracks Across Borders Scenic and Historic Byway
Trail of the Ancients Scenic and Historic Byway
Trail Ridge Road/Beaver Meadow Scenic Byway
Unaweep Tabeguache Scenic Byway
West Elk Loop Scenic and Historic Byway

See also

Scenic byways in the United States

Notes

References

External links

America's Byways
America's Scenic Byways: Colorado
Bureau of Land Management Back Country Byways
Colorado Department of Transportation
Colorado Scenic & Historic Byways Commission
Colorado Scenic & Historic Byways
Colorado Travel Map
Colorado Tourism Office
History Colorado
National Forest Scenic Byways

 
Lists of roads in Colorado